is a film made by controversial Japanese director Kōji Wakamatsu in 1967. Wakamatsu's most famous film, it is based on the mass murder spree of Richard Speck in 1966.

Plot 
A young man breaks into a nurses' rooming house and one-by-one kills off the nurses therein.
In the tradition of Wakamatsu's other Pinku eiga, there is much sexuality and nudity. However most of the actual murders take place off screen. Like other examples in Wakamatsu's work, the plot simplicity often feels like a "sadistic haiku".

Cast
 Jūrō Kara as The Handsome Boy
 Keiko Koyanagi as The Head Nurse
 Miki Hayashi as Nurse A
 Shoko Kidowaki as Nurse B
 Makiko Saegusa as Nurse C
 Kyoko Yoyoi as Nurse D
 Michiko Sakamoto as The Young Girl
 Gusaku Satô as Riot Policeman
 Shûzô Tanaka as Riot Policeman
 Matajûrô Arafune as Riot Policeman
 Kentarô Aichi as Riot Policeman

Production
The film was shot in black and white in just three days, probably much of it improvised and because of the low budget, many of the actresses were not professionals.

Criticism 
Like many films of this nature, Violated Angels was called anti-feminist and misogynistic by some critics. In Film As A Subversive Art, a book on underground cinema, Amos Vogel praises Wakamatsu's artistic talent, yet pans the film for its "...anti-feminist sadism which is not based on any ideological explanation and finally contributes misanthropic flavour to his work."

Notes

References

External links 
 
 
 

1967 films
Pink films
Films directed by Kōji Wakamatsu
1960s pornographic films
1960s Japanese films